Munawar Abad, locally known as Muniwar (Munawarabad), is a town located in heart of Srinagar in the Indian union territory of Jammu and Kashmir. It is 2 km from Lal Chowk & Around 1.2 Kms. From famous Dal Lake. Munawar Abad is the main link between downtown Srinagar and central Srinagar.

More Info

Due to its central location, Muniwar is now becoming an important commercial hub of the city. New shopping complexes are being built. Also there are a number of guest houses and hotels which provide accommodation to tourists, students from other states and other people who come to Srinagar for business purposes. Near Baba Demb Road there is Srinagar's biggest furniture market.

List of guest houses and hotels
 Hotel Downtown (A 4-star, Heritage, Boutique Property)
 Hotel Mughal Palace
 Hotel Samar
 Hotel Dew
 Ikhwan Hotel (Currently occupied by CRPF)
 Rustum Guest House
 Nageena Guest House
 Khybar Hotel
 Hotel Bahar
 Reshi Guest House
 Aman Guest House
 Hotel Azad
 Hotel New Shalimar
 The Red Chillies Restaurant 
 Hotel Rejent

Educational institutions
 SMD High School
 Al-Huda Public School
 Kamla Nehru School (B.B.Shah)
 Darasgah Taleem-ul-Quran (Munawarabad)
 Dar-ul-uloom Dawoodiah
 Maktab i Emamia
 Maktab (ithna-ashari) affiliated with Tanzeemul-Maktatib.

See also

List of topics on the land and the people of Jammu and Kashmir
Kashmiri people
Kashmiri cuisine
Kanger
Kashmiriyat

References

Cities and towns in Srinagar district